Gap Band IV is the sixth album (contrary to the title) by The Gap Band, released in 1982 on Total Experience Records. The album reached #1 on the Black Albums chart and #14 on the Pop Albums chart, achieved platinum status, and is considered their most successful project.

The album produced the singles "Early in the Morning" (#1 Black Singles, #13 Club Play Singles, #24 Pop Singles), "You Dropped a Bomb on Me" (#2 Black Singles, #39 Club Play Singles, #31 Pop Singles), and "Outstanding" (#1 Black Singles, #24 Club Play Singles, #51 Pop Singles). It also achieved a rare feat in which every song on the album received radio airplay.

It was the first album producer Lonnie Simmons released directly on his label, Total Experience Records. The album was later reissued on CD in 1994 by Mercury Records.

Track listing

Personnel
Charlie Wilson - Keyboards, Synthesizer, Percussion, Lead and Backing Vocals
Ronnie Wilson - Trumpet, Flugelhorn, Keyboards, Synthesizer, Percussion, Backing Vocals
Robert Wilson -  Bass, Guitar, Percussion, Backing Vocals
Oliver Scott - Horns, Synthesizer, Keyboards 
Raymond Calhoun - Drums, Percussion
Melvin Webb, Ronnie Kaufman - Drums
Dionne Oliver - Bass
Fred Jenkins, Glen Nightingale, Jimi Macon - Guitar
Robert "Goodie" Whitfield, Louis Cabaza - Keyboards, Synthesizer
Wilmer Raglin- Horns, Backing Vocals
Andy Ward, Earl Roberson, Larry Stone - Horns
David Drew, Marva King, Maxayn Lewis, Alisa Peoples, Calvin Yarbrough, Lonnie Simmons, Rudy Taylor, Sheila Young, Val Young - Backing Vocals

Charts

Singles

See also
List of Billboard number-one R&B albums of 1982

References

External links
 
 Gap Band IV at Discogs

1982 albums
The Gap Band albums
Total Experience Records albums
Albums recorded at Total Experience Recording Studios